Sadhana Shivdasani (2 September 1941 – 25 December 2015), known mononymously as Sadhana, was an Indian actress who worked in Hindi films, primarily active between 1958-1981. Regarded as one of the finest and iconic actresses of the golden age of Hindi Cinema, Sadhana was noted for her exquisite beauty, understated acting and trend-setting fashion statements. Popularly known as "The Mystery Girl" for her stint as the "mysterious woman" in the suspense thriller trilogy films directed by Raj Khosla during the mid 1960s, Sadhana was ranked among the highest-paid actresses in the country from mid-1960s to early 1970s.

Born in Karachi, Sadhana and her family migrated to Bombay during the partition of India when she was 7 years old. She aspired to become an actress since her childhood. After making an unnoticed and uncredited appearance in Shree 420 (1955), Sadhana became the protègè of the director Sashadhar Mukherjee, who enrolled her in his acting school and then provided her with her first starring role, in the romantic comedy Love In Simla (1960), where her distinctive hairstyle became a rage and came to be known as "Sadhana Cut". Following the success of Love In Simla, Sadhana went on to establish herself as an actress with several box-office hits, including the social satire and light hearted romantic dramas such as Parakh (1960) and Asli-Naqli (1962), the war film Hum Dono (1961) and the adventurous thriller Ek Musafir Ek Haseena (1962).

She followed this initial success with her greatest commercial successes—the Muslim social romantic drama Mere Mehboob (1963), the costume drama Rajkumar (1964), romantic family drama Arzoo (1965); the multi-starrer Waqt (1965) and the mystery-thriller trilogy such as Woh Kaun Thi (1964), Mera Saaya (1966) and Anita (1967).    

Her health deteriorated in the latter half of 1960s due to hyperthyroidism, which forced her to take a brief break from work. She went to Boston for her treatment and returned to acting in 1969, starring in two consecutive box-office hits—Ek Phool Do Mali and Intaqam. In 1974, the actress made her directorial debut with the crime thriller Geetaa Mera Naam, and later withdrew from acting. Her final screen appearance was in the delayed release Ulfat Ki Nayi Manzilein (1994). In 2002, she received the IIFA Lifetime Achievement Award for her contributions to Indian cinema.

Sadhana was married to her Love in Simla director R.K. Nayyar on 7 March,1966. Their marriage lasted for nearly 30 years and ended when Nayyar died in September 1995 due to Astma. 

She was admitted to Hinduja Hospital on 24 December 2015, following a high fever and also complained of breathlessness. She died on the morning of 25 December 2015.

Early life
 
Born as Anjali Shivdasani in a Sindhi Hindu family in Karachi, British India on 2 September 1941, she was the second child of her parents Shivram Shivdasani and Lali Devi. However, as her father used to be a big fan of Bengali actress-dancer Sadhana Bose, he renamed his daughter as Sadhana at the age of 5. Her father was the elder brother of actor Hari Shivdasani, father of actress Babita. Sadhana had an elder sister named Sarla Shivdasani. 

The family migrated from Karachi during the partition of India and settled in Bombay (now Mumbai). Her mother home-schooled her until she was 8 years old, after which she studied at Auxilium Convent School, Wadala. After her schooling, she went ahead to pursue her education in Arts Degree at Jai Hind College.  During her college days she used to act in several plays, but when the family was finding it difficult to make both ends meet, Sadhana started working as a typist in Colaba, in order to support her family. She attended the morning college and used to work in the second half of the day. However, she wasn't able to complete her degree and later joined films. She aspired to have a career in films right from childhood and actress Nutan was said to have been her inspiration. She was also a big fan of actor Dev Anand, with whom she had worked in Hum Dono (1961) and Asli-Naqli (1962).

Career

Early career
 
Sadhana aspired to be an actress since childhood. In 1955, she played a chorus girl in the song "Mur mur ke na dekh mur mur ke" in Raj Kapoor's Shree 420. When she was 15 years old, she was approached by some producers who had seen her act in a college play. They cast her in India's first Sindhi film titled Abaana (1958), where she played the role of Sheila Ramani's younger sister.

A photograph of her taken during the promotional shoot for the film Abaana (1958) appeared in the movie magazine Screen. It was then that Sashadhar Mukherjee, one of Hindi cinema's leading producers at that time, noticed her. She joined Mukherjee's acting school along with her debutant co-star Joy Mukherjee, Sashadhar's son. Ram Krishna Nayyar (R.K. Nayyar), who had previously worked as assistant director on a few films, directed this film. He also created her trademark look, called the Sadhana cut, inspired by British actress Audrey Hepburn. The Filmalaya Production banner thus introduced Joy, Sadhana and her iconic hairstyle in their 1960 romantic film Love in Simla. The film was declared a hit at the box office and was listed in the top 10 films of 1960. During this period she would again work under the same banner opposite Joy in Ek Musafir Ek Haseena.

Stardom
Besides Love in Simla, Sadhana was signed by acclaimed director Bimal Roy for his satirical film on Indian democracy, Parakh. She portrayed a simple village girl in this multi-award-winning film. The film was a semi hit at box office and is known for the song "O Sajna Barkha Bahar Aai" sung by Lata Mangeshkar.

Major breakthrough
 1961: Hum Dono - In this 1961's hit film, Hum Dono, she played the love interest of Dev Anand. This black-and-white film was colourised and re-released in 2011. Rediff.com in the film's review writes about Sadhana: "Her eyes, expressive and captivating, do most of the work, while she balances out her submissiveness with a firm tongue." The duet "Abhi na jaao chhodkar" from the film Hum Dono is regarded as "the most romantic song" by actor Shah Rukh Khan and director Sanjay Leela Bhansali. Author Amit Chaudhuri in an essay comparing cultures, says that Sadhana's curious expressions in the song denote listener's peculiar ecstasy while in other cinemas it would mean sex or love.
 1962: Asli-Naqli - In 1962, she was again paired with Dev Anand in Asli-Naqli by director Hrishikesh Mukherjee. The film has two hit songs "Tujhe Jeevan Ki Dor Se", sung by both Mohammed Rafi and Lata Mangeshkar and "Tera Mera Pyar Amar", sung by Lata Mangeshkar. The same year saw director-screenwriter Raj Khosla cast her opposite Joy Mukherjee in Ek Musafir Ek Hasina. She had debuted with Joy Mukherjee with the film Love in Shimla in 1960. Khosla would again work with Sadhana to make a suspense thriller trilogy.

 1963: Mere Mehboob - This film was the highest grossing Indian film of 1963. The film stars Sadhana, Rajendra Kumar, Ashok Kumar, Nimmi, Pran, Johnny Walker and Ameeta. In this film, Sadhana played her first role in the technicolor film. The film Mere Mehboob was directed by H. S. Rawail. The song "Mere Mehboob Tujhe" was shot in the University Hall and in a couple of places, one gets to see the university. The song became very popular upon release. The opening scene of the film shows the famous residential hall and the associated hall "Victoria Gate". The film was the blockbuster of 1963, and ranked in the top 5 films of the 1960s.

 1964: Woh Kaun Thi - In 1964, she played a double role in the first of the suspense-thriller trilogy; Woh Kaun Thi?. This white-sari-clad performance opposite Manoj Kumar earned her first Filmfare nomination as Best Actress. Through this role she got to be part of Lata Mangeshkar – Madan Mohan’s songs "Naina barse" and "Lag jaa gale". Rediff.com called her a show-stopper "with an intriguing Mona Lisa-like smile". The film was a box office hit. Raj Khosla cast her in two more successful mystery films; Mera Saaya (1966) and Anita (1967) thus making her famous as the "Mystery girl".
1965 : Arzoo- Arzoo was a box office success, with Sadhana, Rajendra Kumar and Feroz Khan in lead roles. The film had songs like "Ae Phoolon ki Rani" sung by Mohammad Rafi and " Aji rooth kar ab" , sung by Lata Mangeshkar.

 1966: Mera Saaya - Mera Saaya was a box office success, a courtroom drama film, again saw her playing a double role, now opposite Sunil Dutt. The film was the third film directed by Raj Khosla with Sadhana. The song "Jhumka Gira Re" sung by Asha Bhosle and composed by Madan Mohan saw Sadhana perform dance steps choreographed by Saroj Khan. Khan was then an assistant to dance director B. Sohanlal. The song became so popular that excited audience in cinema halls used to throw coins at the screen, and is one of the most requested songs on the radio. The film also had the classic songs "Mera Saaya Saath Hoga" and "Nainon Mein Badra Chhaye", both voiced by Lata Mangeshkar.
 1965: Waqt- In this 1965 drama film, Sadhana appeared alongside Sunil Dutt. For her performance in this hit film, Sadhana got her second Filmfare nomination as Best Actress for the role of Meena, in Yash Chopra's directorial saga Waqt (1965). She stood out in Bollywood's first ever ensemble cast by bringing out the fashion of tight churidar-kurtas. The song has hit Hindi songs such as "Aye Meri Zohra Zabeen", sung by Manna Dey, "Hum Jab Simat Ke", sung by Mahendra Kapoor and Asha Bhosle, "Waqt Se Din Aur Raat", sung by Mohammed Rafi and "Aage Bhi Jaane Na Tu", sung by Asha Bhosle. The film proved to be 1965's "blockbuster hit".

 1967: Anita - In this 1967 suspense film, Sadhana appeared alongside Manoj Kumar with whom she had starred in lead role in the blockbuster film Woh Kaun Thi. This was the last film of the suspense-thriller trilogy of Khosla-Sadhana partnership.
1969: Inteqam - This film was directed by R.K. Nayyar, and stars Sadhana and Sanjay Khan in lead roles and supported by Ashok Kumar, Jeevan, Rajendra Nath, Rehman, Helen and Anju Mahendru. The film features the first cabaret number song "Aa Jaane Jaan", also a rarity through her career. The film was a success at box office and marked the return of Sadhana after her brief illness, and her husband directed the film.

Her other notable works in the 1960s include performances in Gaban (1966) and Budtameez (1966). Sadhana and Shammi Kapoor worked together in 4 films Rajkumar, Budtameez, Sachaai and Chhote Sarkar of which the first 3 were box office hits and the pair got good audience acceptance.

 1964: Rajkumar - Rajkumar stars Sadhana, Shammi Kapoor, Pran, Prithviraj Kapoor, Om Prakash and Rajindernath. The film was a box office success and has the hit songs "Aaja Aai Bahar", sung by Lata Mangeshkar, "Tumne Pukara Aur Hum Chale Aaye", sung by Mohammed Rafi and Suman Kalyanpur, "Tumne Kisi Ki Jaan Ko" and "Is Rang Badalti Duniya Mein", both sung by Mohammed Rafi. 

1969: Sachaai - Sachaai stars Sadhana, Shammi Kapoor, Sanjeev Kumar, Helen, Johnny Walker and Pran. This film was a box office hit with songs like " Sau baras ki zindagi", sung by Mohammed Rafi and Asha Bhosle " Ae dost mere maine duniya dekhi hai" , sung by Mohammed Rafi and Manna Dey and " Mere gunaah maaf kar" sung by Mohammed Rafi.
 1969: Ek Phool Do Mali - This Indian Hindi film of 1969 stars Sadhana and Sanjay Khan in lead roles and has hit songs such as "Ye Parda Hata Do", sung by Asha Bhosle and Mohammed Rafi, "Aulad Walo", sung by Asha Bhosle and Mohammed Rafi, "O Nanhe Se Farishte" sung by Mohammed Rafi, "Saiyan Le Gayi Jiya", sung by Asha Bhosle and "Tujhe Suraj Kahoon Ya Chanda" sung by Manna Dey.

End of acting career

Sadhana had health issues due to her thyroid, which she got treated in Boston. After returning from the US, she starred in the successful movies Intaquam (1969), Ek phool do mali (1969), Sachaai (1969), Dil Daulat Duniya (1972) and Geeta Mera Naam (1974).

In Intaquam she played the role of a woman who revengefully lures the son of her own boss who cheated her, to be put behind the bars for a crime he did not commit. In 1974, her directorial venture Geeta Mera Naam was released. Produced by her husband, the film had herself playing the lead actress along with Sunil Dutt and Feroz Khan. It was also Saroj Khan's first film as an independent dance director. The film did "above average" business at the box office.

After that, she retired from acting, as she did not want to be cast as a side-actress or do character roles. Later, she and her husband formed a production company. She also produced the movie Pati Parmeshwar, starring Dimple Kapadia in 1989.

Personal life
Sadhana married her Love in Simla director Ram Krishna Nayyar on 7 March 1966. Their love blossomed on the film set. But as she was very young then, her parents opposed it. They were married for nearly thirty years, until his death in 1995 from asthma. The couple had no children. In 2013, she stated that she doesn't keep in touch with her first cousin Babita but does keep in touch with actresses such as Asha Parekh, Waheeda Rehman, Nanda, Shammi and Helen.

She suffered from eye problems due to hyperthyroidism. After her retirement from acting, she refused to be photographed. Living in Santacruz, Mumbai, she rented an apartment building owned by singer Asha Bhosle.

Fashion icon
Sadhana introduced the fringe hairstyle in the Indian film industry in her first film Love in Simla. R.K. Nayyar, director of the film and her future husband, suggested the fringe style in order to make her forehead look narrower. Sadhana says: "They tried to stick a strip near the hair-line, but it didn’t work out." Nayyar then suggested she go for the fringe style as was then sported by the Hollywood actress Audrey Hepburn. The fringe soon became popular and a fashion fad in the 1960s.
The style was copied by girls in India and is still known by the same name. The look suited the role of naughty, pretty, glamorous Sonia that she played. But when Sadhana went on the shoot for Bimal Roy's Parakh, Roy was disappointed to see her modern look. She had to stick her fringe back in order to match the simple village girl she played here. In 1963, when she signed to play a role of a simple Muslim girl from Aligarh in Mere Mehboob, Sadhana undid her famous "Sadhana cut" to fit the bill. She had centre-parted her hair and wore it in a plait, which was immediately discarded by the director H.S. Rawail. He said that the audience wanted to see her signature "Sadhana cut" and demanded it. Many years later, the Bollywood actress Deepika Padukone sported the same fringe in her films Om Shanti Om (2007) and Chandni Chowk To China (2009).
Sadhana is also credited with bringing into fashion the tight churidar-kurta. She went with this concept of gracefully changing the traditional loose salwar kameez to her director Yash Chopra for the 1965 film Waqt. Chopra felt insecure and thought that it would not be accepted. But Sadhana, with the help of her fashion designer Bhanu Athaiya showed him a sample, which he liked. The trend lasted well into the 1970s and can be seen, adopted by many actresses.

In a song sequence of "Phir Milenge Chalte Chalte" for Rab Ne Bana Di Jodi (2008), actress Bipasha Basu dressed herself in a white churidar-kurta and also frolicked with the famous fringe as a tribute to Sadhana.

In 2014, Sadhana made a rare public appearance walking the ramp in a pink sari at a fashion show to support the cause for cancer and AIDS patients. She was escorted by her relative, actor Ranbir Kapoor.

Accolades

Death
During her later years, Sadhana was involved in court cases and suffered from illness. She had undergone an emergency surgery due to a bleeding oral lesion in December 2014 at the K J Somaiya Medical College.

Sadhana died on 25 December 2015 in Hinduja Hospital, Mumbai after being hospitalised with high fever. The illness she briefly suffered from was officially undisclosed, Sadhana was cremated at Oshiwara crematorium in Mumbai, Maharashtra. Bollywood stars such Anushka Sharma, Karan Johar, Madhur Bhandarkar, Lata Mangeshkar and several others expressed their sorrow at the loss.

Filmography

References

External links

 

1941 births
2015 deaths
Actresses in Hindi cinema
20th-century Indian actresses
Sindhi people
Actresses from Karachi
Deaths from cancer in India
Indian women film directors
Jai Hind College alumni